May Kitson (born Mary Ann Morrell, October 29, 1866 – June 17, 1945), was a British-born American silent film character actor active between 1917 and 1925.

Family
Kitson was born in London, England to Tom and Elizabeth (née Chandler) Morrell. Her family moved to New Jersey, United States in 1873 after her father's death.

May and John William Kitson were married in 1882 and their first child Howard Waldo was born in March 1883; a daughter Velma May followed in 1887. Kitson was widowed in February 1888. Robert Ellin and Kitson were co-executors of Kitson's estate. Her husband's firm, Ellin & Kitson, was changed to Ellin, Kitson & Company. JW Kitson Estate became a silent partner until the children reached maturity.

She was widowed again following a brief marriage in 1896. Her third husband, William J. Swan, also predeceased her, dying around 1909. She applied to the NY Court to change her name back to Mary Kitson. In 1920 she applied for a United States passport. In November 1914, her son Waldo married Lela Cole, a short story writer of western romances. In 1910 her daughter Velma married Commodore Byron McCandless, a 1905 Naval Academy graduate.

Death
Kitson died on June 17, 1945 at the U.S. Naval Repair Base, in San Diego, California at her daughter's home, the Commanding Officer's Quarters. Her ashes are near her son Waldo's in Hollywood Forever Cemetery, Los Angeles formerly The Hollywood Cemetery, located opposite Paramount Studios, not to be confused with the one on the east coast.

Filmography
The Firing Line (1919) Constance Paliser
Come Out of the Kitchen (1919) Mrs. Daingerfield
The Burning Question (1919)
The Woman God Sent (1920)
Father Tom (1921) Mary
The Family Closet (1921) Mrs. Dinsmore
 Flesh and Spirit (1922) Mrs. Wallace
Other Women's Clothes (1922) Mrs. Roger Montayne
The New School Teacher (1924) Mrs. Buck

References

New York Times Movie Review (May 12, 1919), p. 11
Guide to the Actors' Equity Association: Records 1913-1991 Allen, Miss Ray and May Kitson v. O'Brian Productions Father Tom (motion picture): Salary claims, 1921-1922 
Listing of known movies:
citwf.com
showbizdata.com
afi.com

External links

1866 births
1945 deaths
American stage actresses
American film actresses
American silent film actresses
Burials at Hollywood Forever Cemetery
British emigrants to the United States
20th-century American actresses